2,3-Dimethylhexane is a structural isomer of octane.

References

Alkanes
Hydrocarbons